Saint-Cuthbert is a municipality in the Lanaudière region of Quebec, Canada, part of the D'Autray Regional County Municipality.

Demographics
Population trend:
 Population in 2011: 1839 (2006 to 2011 population change: -5.1%)
 Population in 2006: 1938
 Population in 2001: 1899
 Population in 1996: 1722 (or 1923 when adjusted for 2001 boundaries)
 Population in 1991: 1645

Private dwellings occupied by usual residents: 777 (total dwellings: 861)

Mother tongue:
 English as first language: 0.8%
 French as first language: 98.2%
 English and French as first language: 0%
 Other as first language: 1%

Education

Commission scolaire des Samares operates francophone public schools, including:
 École Sainte-Anne

The Sir Wilfrid Laurier School Board operates anglophone public schools, including:
 Joliette Elementary School in Saint-Charles-Borromée
 Joliette High School in Joliette

See also
List of municipalities in Quebec

References

External links

Saint-Cuthbert - MRC d'Autray

Incorporated places in Lanaudière
Municipalities in Quebec
1740 establishments in the French colonial empire
Populated places established in 1740